The St. Martin River is a tributary of Isle of Wight Bay in Worcester County, Maryland.

A short river, the St. Martin broadens rapidly to enter Isle of Wight Bay where the bay is crossed by Maryland Route 90. Most of the river is a tidal estuary.  Its two main tributaries are the Bishopville Prong and the Shingle Landing Prong.

The St. Martin forms the northern boundary of Ocean Pines, Maryland; Bishopville, Maryland is on the Bishopville Prong of the river.

References

Rivers of Worcester County, Maryland
Rivers of Maryland